The Piel CP.70 Beryl is a French twin-seat, single-engine sport aircraft designed by Claude Piel. It was first flown in France in the 1960s and marketed for amateur construction.

Design and development

Designed by Claude Piel, the Beryl uses the same wing design as the Piel Emeraude but with a new fuselage, exchanging the Emeraude's side-by-side configuration seating for seating in tandem. As originally designed, the aircraft is fitted with fixed, tricycle undercarriage with a steerable nosewheel. Construction throughout is of doped fabric-covered wood.

An aerobatic version, designated the CP.750 was also developed. This differs from the basic CP.70 in having a reduced wingspan, fixed tailwheel undercarriage and a slightly longer fuselage. It retains the CP.70's wooden wings, but the fuselage is built of welded steel tube and still covered in fabric.

Operational history
The Beryl has been homebuilt by amateur constructors and in 2009 there were still four examples active on the French civil aircraft register. The prototype F-PMEQ, completed in 1965 with tricycle undercarriage, was still active in 2014 modified as a CP.703 with tail-wheel undercarriage. Examples of the design have also been completed in Brazil and the United States.

Variants
CP.70
Standard variant for homebuilding powered by a  Continental A65-8F or  Lycoming O-235 engine.

CP.750
a CP-70 with 150 hp Lycoming O-320 engine with a reduced wingspan, fixed tailwheel undercarriage, and a slightly longer fuselage.
CP.751
CP-750 with 200 hp Lycoming O-360-A2A engine.

Specifications (CP.70)

Notes

References

 
 
 

1960s French sport aircraft
Piel aircraft
Homebuilt aircraft
Low-wing aircraft
Aircraft first flown in 1965
Single-engined tractor aircraft